The Arman is a left tributary of the river Crișul Negru in Romania. It discharges into the Crișul Negru near Uileacu de Beiuș.

References

Rivers of Romania
Rivers of Bihor County